James Clark Bunten may refer to:

James Clark Bunten (engineer) (1838–1901), Scottish engineer who became chairman of the Caledonian Railway
James Clark Bunten (sailor) (1875–1935), Scottish sailor who competed at the 1908 Summer Olympics